Gustaaf Martinus Oosterling (30 June 1873 – 11 January 1928) was a Surinamese photographer, who had a photo studio on the Gonggrijpstraat in Paramaribo. Before turning to photography, Oosterling worked as a draughtsman, calligrapher and painter.

Biography 

Gustaaf Martinus Oosterling was born on 30 June 1873 in Paramaribo to Salomon Jacob Oosterling (1841–1885) and Nanette Louisa Sophia Bosfaeld (1839–1878). His grandfather Cornelis Oosterling (1813–1858) was originally from Groede in Zeeland and migrated to Suriname in the early 19th century.

Oosterling died on 11 January 1928 at age 54. His studio was continued by his son Guillaume David Oosterling.

Personal life 
Gustaaf Martinus Oosterling married Louisa Ferdina Flu in October 1905. In the 1921 Suriname census, there are five daughters and four sons listed as living with him and his wife on Gonggrijpstraat 69. Oosterling and his family were members of the Free Evangelical Church of Paramaribo.

Gallery

Notes

References

External link 

Photographs of Gustaaf Martinus Oosterling at the Surinaams Museum

1873 births
1928 deaths
People from Paramaribo
Surinamese photographers